The 2015 2. deild karla (English: Men's Second Division) was the 50th season of third-tier football in Iceland. Twelve teams contest the league. Play began on 9 May and concluded on 19 September.

Teams
The league is contested by twelve clubs, eight of which played in the division during the 2014 season. There are four new clubs from the previous campaign:
KV and Tindastóll were relegated from the 2014 1. deild karla, replacing Fjarðabyggð and Grótta who were promoted to the 2015 1. deild karla
Höttur and Leiknir F. were promoted from the 2014 3. deild karla, in place of Völsungur and Reynir S. who were relegated to the 2015 3. deild karla

Club information

League table

Results
Each team plays every opponent once home and away for a total of 22 matches per club, and 132 matches altogether.

References

2. deild karla seasons
Iceland
Iceland
3